Harleyford Manor is a country house near Marlow in Buckinghamshire.

The house is listed Grade I on the National Heritage List for England, and its gardens are also listed Grade II on the Register of Historic Parks and Gardens.

The urn to the south west of the house, the ice house to the north east, and the dairy to the north, and the temple to the north east are all listed Grade II.

In addition to the buildings, two statues of Robert Clayton, to the west and to the east of the house, are also listed Grade II.

History
The house was designed by Sir Robert Taylor in the Georgian style and built for William Clayton, a Member of Parliament, in 1753. The house remained in the Clayton family until 1950. The present owners, who have owned the property since 1952, converted the property to office use in 1988. They operate a large marina and offer boat mooring services but plan to convert the property into flats.

References

Grade I listed buildings in Buckinghamshire
Country houses in Buckinghamshire
Grade I listed houses
Grade II listed parks and gardens in Buckinghamshire
Grade II listed buildings in Buckinghamshire
Buildings and structures on the River Thames
Georgian architecture in England
Marlow, Buckinghamshire
Robert Taylor buildings